Chitwood is a surname. Notable people with the surname include:

Bill Chitwood (1890–1961), American fiddler
Christina Chitwood (born 1990), American ice dancer
Joie Chitwood (1912–1988), American racing driver and businessman
May Belle Hutson Chitwood (1908-1994), American author, nematologist, helminthologist, and zoologist
Randolph Chitwood, American surgeon
Whitney Chitwood, American stand-up comedian

See also
Chitwood, Oregon, an unincorporated community in Oregon, United States